Deadwood Creek is a tributary of Lake Creek in the Siuslaw River basin in Lane County in the U.S. state of Oregon. Beginning near Taylor Butte in the Central Oregon Coast Range, it meanders generally southwest through the Siuslaw National Forest to meet the larger creek at the rural community of Deadwood.

Upstream of Deadwood, the creek passes under Deadwood Creek Bridge, a covered bridge carrying Deadwood Loop Road. The bridge was added to the National Register of Historic Places in 1979.

Fishing
The creek supports a population of wild winter steelhead for which catch and release fishing is allowed. However, fishing is not allowed for any species in Deadwood Creek from April 1 to December 31 to protect Chinook salmon while they are spawning.

Tributaries
The creek's named tributaries from source to mouth are Fawn, Elk, Panther, Buck, Rock and Karlstrom creeks. Then come Alpha, Deer, Bear, Raleigh, and Swartz creeks followed by West Fork Deadwood Creek. Below that are Boyle and Green creeks.

See also
 List of rivers of Oregon

References

Rivers of Lane County, Oregon
Rivers of Oregon